Polyoxymethylene dimethyl ethers (PODE or DMMn) are a class of chemical compounds with the molecular formula H3CO(CH2O)nCH3 where n is typically about 3 to 8.

PODE can be produced from methylal and formaldehyde or a formaldehyde equivalent such as paraformaldehyde or trioxane.

PODE is used as a diesel fuel additive and as a solvent.

References

Ethers
Acetals